Mohammadabad (also Romanized as Moḩammadābād) is a village in Lar Rural District, Laran District, Shahrekord County, Chaharmahal and Bakhtiari Province, Iran. At the 2006 census, its population was 18, in 5 families.

References 

Populated places in Shahr-e Kord County